François-Olivier Rousseau (born 20 September 1947, Boulogne-Billancourt) is a French journalist and writer.

Biography 
A young literary critic at Le Matin de Paris at the end of the 1970s, he became a novelist, met with success immediately and collected several literary prizes. He then left Paris for the Isle of Man where he settled in the capital, Douglas, a town of barely more than 20,000 inhabitants. He devotes himself only to the writing between two voyages.

French detesting France, a specialist in the period from Napoleon III to the First World War (which he considers to be "an accident that is incomprehensible to me, I try to understand what could have provoked this manifestation of the death instinct of the West and I like to dream what would have been this century without the war"), he particularly likes to depict with many details the lives of artists going through this era.

The Éditions du Seuil published a novelization of the film he cowrote, Children of the Century, devoted to the love affair between George Sand and Alfred de Musset.

Bibliography 
1977: Le Regard du voyageur, Stock
1981: L'Enfant d'Édouard, Mercure de France prix Médicis 1981
1985: Sébastien Doré, Mercure de France, prix Marcel Proust 1986, prix Bertrand de Jouvenel of the Académie française
1988:La Gare de Wannsee, Grasset, Grand prix du roman de l'Académie française 1988)
1991: Andrée Putman, Éditions du Regard
1991: Le Jour de l'éclipse, Grasset
1995: L'Heure de gloire, Grasset
1999: Les Enfants du siècle, Le Seuil
2001: Le Passeur, Stock
2003: Le Plaisir de la déception, Stock
2003: Grand Hôtel du Pacifique, Éditions du Rocher
2004: Princesse Marie, Le Seuil
2006: Le Faux Pli, Gallimard

Filmography 
as screenwriter:
 Children of the Century by Diane Kurys
 Absolument fabuleux by Gabriel Aghion
 Nuit noire 17 octobre 1961 by 
 Nathalie... by Anne Fontaine
 The Princess of Montpensier by Bertrand Tavernier
  by Benoît Jacquot

External links 
 François-Olivier Rousseau on Babelio
 François-Olivier Rousseau on Allaty Éditions
 François Olivier Rousseau: Le plaisir de la déception video on INA.fr (24 February 2003)
 François-Olivier Rousseau on the site of the Académie française
 

20th-century French journalists
20th-century French writers
21st-century French writers
French screenwriters
Prix Médicis winners
1947 births
People from Boulogne-Billancourt
Living people
Grand Prix du roman de l'Académie française winners